Wiggle Bay is the 15th album by Australian band the Wiggles. It was released in 2002 by ABC Music and distributed by Roadshow Entertainment.

Track list
 Wiggle Bay (intro)
 Wiggle Bay
 Dancing in the Sand (intro)
 Dancing in the Sand
 Swim Like A Fish (intro)
 Swim Like A Fish
 C'est Wags, C'est Bon (intro)
 C'est Wags, C'est Bon
 Dance a Cachucha (intro)
 Dance a Cachucha
 Rolling Down the Sandhills (intro)
 Rolling Down the Sandhills
 Running Up the Sandhills
 Let's Make Some Rosy Tea (intro)
 Let's Make Some Rosy Tea
 Zing Zang Wing Wang Wong (intro)
 Zing Zang Wing Wang Wong
 Watching The Waves (intro)
 Watching The Waves
 Let's Have a Barbie on the Beach (intro)
 Let's Have a Barbie on the Beach
 Space Dancing (intro)
 Eagle Rock
 Dance Your Gloomies Away!
 What's This Button For?
 The Zeezap Song
 Going Home
 Fergus' Jig (instrumental)

Video

Wiggle Bay was also released on ABC Video in 2002.

In August–September 2020, the video was uploaded to the Wiggles' YouTube channel in multiple parts.

Song List
 Wiggle Bay
 Dancing in the Sand
 Swim Like A Fish
 C'est Wags, C'est Bon
 Dance a Cachuca
 Rolling Down the Sandhills/Running Up the Sandhills
 Let's Make Some Rosy Tea
 Zing Zang Wing Wang Wong
 Watching The Waves
 Let's Have a Barbie on the Beach

Cast
The cast as presented on the videos:

 The Wiggles are
 Murray Cook
 Jeff Fatt
 Anthony Field
 Greg Page

Additional Cast
 Captain Feathersword: Paul Paddick
 Dorothy the Dinosaur: Corrine O'Rafferty
 Henry the Octopus: Kristy Talbot
 Wags the Dog: Andrew McCourt
 Magdalena the Mermaid: Naomi Wallace

References

External links

The Wiggles albums
2002 video albums
The Wiggles videos
Australian children's musical films